2009 Super League season results details the regular season and play-off match results of Super League XIV.

Regular season

Round 1 

 The first full round of the season, two games (one each from rounds 3 and 17) having been played the weekend before.
 Bradford and Hull KR played out the first draw of the season at the Grattan Stadium.

Round 2 

 The fixture between Harlequins and Bradford will be played at another time during the course of the season. It was originally scheduled to be played before Round 1 to accommodate a friendly with Manly-Warringah Sea Eagles on Round 2 weekend but was postponed because a frozen pitch at The Twickenham Stoop. The match was rearranged for 8 August, to coincide with the semifinal stage of the 2009 Challenge Cup, in which both sides were knocked-out in Round 4.
 Leeds maintained their 100% winning start to the season with a hard-fought victory over Hull KR.
 Wigan fell to Castleford in their third successive loss - their worst start to a season in 24 years, and their worst ever start in the Super League.

Round 3 

 The Leeds vs Celtic fixture was the first fixture of the season, played before Round 1 in order to accommodate Leeds Rhinos' World Club Challenge fixture against Manly-Warringah Sea Eagles during the Round 3 weekend. Leeds started the defence of their Super League title with a victory over the Crusaders, who were making their Super League début.
 Hull KR became the first team to win a match by a single point in the 2009 season.
 Nineteen-year-old Shaun Ainscough picked up Wigan's Man of the Match award for his second match in-a-row.
 Castleford became the first team of the season to score 50 points or more .

Round 4 
 Celtic and St Helens take part in the lowest-scoring match in Super League history, and the first to be 0-0 at half-time.
 Hull FC and Leeds both continue their unbeaten start to the season, while Celtic and Warrington fail to register their first points, despite running St Helens and Leeds (respectively) close.
 Bradford hooker Wayne Godwin suffers a broken leg in the match against Wigan.

Round 5 
 Hull FC and Leeds both extend their winning start to 5 wins from 5 games, while at the other end of the table, Celtic and Warrington both continue their losing streak, and have now lost all of their first 5 games of the season.

Round 6 
 Hull FC and Leeds both lose, breaking the two remaining 100% season records.
 Warrington win their first game of the season.
 The Celtic vs Wakefield match was postponed 40 minutes before the scheduled kick-off due to "unforeseen circumstances". Later, it was announced that one of Wakefield's players, Leon Walker, had collapsed and died during their reserves match earlier in the day, and this was the reason for the postponement. The match was rearranged to coincide with the quarterfinal stage of the 2009 Challenge Cup, in which both sides had already been knocked-out.

Round 7 
 A minute's silence was held before each match this round in memory of Leon Walker.

Round 8 

 This round saw the traditional Easter derbies, with Wigan taking on St Helens, Leeds travelling to Bradford, Castleford hosting Wakefield, and both Hull clubs meeting at the KC Stadium.
 Bradford win their first home game of the season, with Leeds being denied two tries from the video referee.

Round 9 
 The Easter Monday fixtures.

Round 10 

 Chris Hicks claims a hat-trick and scores 30 points in a 22–58 defeat of Bradford at the Grattan Stadium.
 St Helens become the first team to score 60 points or more in a single game, against Castleford.
 Huddersfield's six-win run comes to an end against Super League champions, Leeds. On the other hand, Hull FC extend their losing run to six with a loss to Wakefield.

Round 11 

 For the first time in over a year, since round 10 of Super League XIII, both St Helens and Leeds lose in the same round.
 The top four teams in the league before this round; St Helens, Leeds, Huddersfield and Wakefield, all lose their fixtures.
 Shaun Ainscough scores 4 tries against Wakefield, while Chris Hicks scores a hat-trick for the second successive weekend, this time against Huddersfield.

Round 12 
 The Magic Weekend fixtures, held over the May Day bank holiday weekend at Murrayfield Stadium in Edinburgh.
 The event attracts an aggregate attendance of approximately 60,000 attendees over the two days. Over 6,000 of these were estimated to be Scottish.
 Paul Sykes scores a hat-trick to deliver Bradford their fourth win of the season.

* The attendances displayed are total aggregate attendances for each of the two days.

Round 13 

 Celtic win their first ever Super League match, ending an 11-match losing sequence.
 Following their win on the Friday night, Hull KR take top position in the league briefly, until St Helens regain top spot on Saturday evening.
 Leeds beat Castleford with the last kick of the match, a penalty conceded on 79:57 and converted after the hooter sounded.

Round 14 

 Hull KR record their sixth win in a row, after a home victory to Castleford, who have failed to win a game during regular time in four matches.
 Bradford lose to both of Super League XIV's newly promoted sides, Celtic and Salford respectively, in successive weeks.
 Wigan's defeat at Warrington means they have never won at the Halliwell Jones Stadium in a professional match to date since the stadium's opening in 2004.
 In the first ever Super League match not to feature an English side, Celtic's hapless form at home continues with a defeat to Catalans, bringing their Brewery Field 2009 record to five defeats out of five.
 David Hodgson claims a hat-trick and Huddersfield score ten tries as Wakefield lose five matches in a row, this being their worst defeat since Round 24 of Super League X in terms of defeat margin.
 Keith Senior scores twice in his 300th match for Leeds, who comfortably beat Hull FC at Headingley.

Round 15 

 Catalans record only their second ever win against Leeds, thanks to a try awarded by the video referee after the full eighty minutes had elapsed.
 Warrington extend their winning streak to five after defeating Castleford.
 Wigan claim their second home win over Salford in as many weekends, following their victory in the Challenge Cup seven days earlier.
 Hull FC's home form continues to decline, after a defeat to St Helens means they have lost all of their last six matches at the KC Stadium.

Round 16 

 A test match between France and England is played in Paris over this weekend. Players on international duty miss their respective club's matches. Due to the test, and because ten Catalans players were selected for France, the round's fixture between Catalans and Salford was rearranged for 7 August.
 Craig Stapleton is sent off for using foul and abusive language in Salford's match against Catalans.
 Castleford drop out of the play-off places on points difference after a heavy defeat to St Helens.
 The first Super League home win at Brewery Field comes with defeat of Wigan.
 For the fiftieth year in a row, Huddersfield fail to win at Headingley. Leeds leapfrog Hull KR for second place.

Round 17 

 Catalans' home match against the Warrington was rearranged to take place in Spain, at the Estadi Olímpic Lluís Companys, the venue for the 1992 Summer Olympics. The aim was to spread the sport of rugby league into Catalonia, in what the Catalans' general manager described as the club's "Magic Weekend". Over 15,000 advance tickets were sold.
 The Wigan vs Wakefield fixture was played before Round 1, due to maintenance work at the JJB Stadium during the month of June in anticipation of the upcoming Premier League season, in which Wigan Athletic F.C. play in sharing the same stadium. Both clubs had a week's break over this round's weekend as a result.

Round 18

Round 19 
 David Howell of Harlequins becomes the first player of the season to be sent off, in Quins' match against Wigan at the JJB.
 Keith Senior, who holds the record for most Super League appearances, plays and scores in his 500th professional match.
 Jean-Philippe Baile picks up a hat-trick for Catalans as Hull KR lose their third game in a row and consequently drop to fourth in the table.

Round 20

Round 21 

 With normal kicker Kyle Eastmond out due to mumps, Paul Wellens misses all six of his attempts at goal in a game St Helens lose.
 Leeds come from behind against Hull KR, to end the round level on points with league leaders St Helens.
 Hull FC bounce back from three straight defeats with a win against Celtic at home.
 Six Catalans players score tries as Harlequins suffer their fifth successive defeat.

Round 22 

 Harlequins drop out of the play-offs for the first time all season, and because of their defeat to St Helens, only five teams remain with a positive points difference.
 Steve Menzies of Bradford becomes the first Super League player to contract swine flu.
 In the last match at the JJB Stadium before its name change on 1 August over 20,000 attendees see Wigan defeat Leeds, the tenth such attendance in the stadium's Super League history.

Round 23 
 For the sixth consecutive year, Wigan fail to win at Knowsley Road.
 Hull FC become the second team to be 'nilled' this season, as Celtic get 'nilled' for the third time.

Round 24 
 Leeds become the first team to score 70 or more points in a match this season.
 Wigan beat Warrington in the first game since the JJB Stadium was renamed as the DW Stadium.
 Danny Brough is sent off for dissent, having already been sin-binned earlier in the match, during Wakefield's defeat of Celtic.

Round 25

Round 26 
 In an ill-tempered affair, Leeds pull ahead of St Helens on points at the top of the table with only one round of the regular season remaining.
 Wigan's win over Hull FC guarantees them a home tie in the first weekend of the play-offs (as they are now sure to finish 5th or 6th in the table), while Hull FC now have no chance of making the play-offs.
 Clint Newton scores a hat-trick in a win that maintains Hull KR's 3rd spot, and leaves Warrington struggling to qualify for the play-offs.
 Like Wigan, Wakefield's win guarantees them 5th or 6th spot, and a home tie in the first round of the play-offs.
 Huddersfield keep up the pressure on Hull KR with a win over Celtic.
 After a sub-standard season, Bradford keep their play-off hopes alive with a win over Salford.
 Castleford guarantee themselves a place in the play-offs, at the expense of Harlequins, who now look unlikely to qualify.

Round 27 
 Leeds secure the League Leaders' Shield for the first time since 2004 with a close victory over Salford.
 Catalans secure a play-off position by beating St Helens.
 Despite winning their fifth game in a row, Bradford fail to make the play-offs.
 Huddersfield beat Wigan to secure 3rd place in the final table.
 Castleford's victory over Celtic guarantees them 7th place in the table.

Final table

Progression table 

 Green cells indicate teams in play-off places at the end of the round. An underlined number indicates the team finished first in the table in that round.
 Note: Table is in round-by-round format, and does not necessarily follow chronological order. Rearranged fixtures are treated as though they were played on their respective rounds' weekends. Rearranged fixtures:
 Harlequins RL vs Bradford Bulls, Round 2
 Leeds Rhinos vs Celtic Crusaders, Round 3
 Celtic Crusaders vs Wakefield Trinity Wildcats, Round 6
 Wigan Warriors vs Wakefield Trinity Wildcats, Round 17

*: Indicates team has a game in-hand due to a postponed match

Play-offs 

The 2009 Super League play-offs took place in September and October 2009. They decided which two teams contested the Grand Final.

Format 

Super League has used a play-off system since Super League III in 1998. When introduced, 5 teams qualified for the play-offs, which was subsequently expanded to 6 teams in 2002. For the first time, eight teams will compete in the play-offs in 2009.

Following the final round of matches, all eight play-off teams will be decided. The 2009 play-offs see the introduction of a system where the winning team from week one with the highest League placing will be allowed to select their opponents for week three.
Except this choosing opportunity, the new format follows the play-off system of the Australian Football League.

Qualifying and Elimination Finals 

 Chev Walker suffers a compound fracture of his leg as Leeds beat Hull KR, to progress to the Qualifying Semi-Finals.
 St Helens and Leeds progressed directly to week three.

Preliminary Semi-Finals

Semi-finals 

 Under the rules of the Super League play-off system, Leeds were awarded a "club call", which allowed them to decide which of the winners from the Preliminary Semi-Finals they played.
 Leeds choose to play Catalans Dragons.

Grand final 

 As winners of the 2009 Grand Final, Leeds contested the 2010 World Club Challenge against the Melbourne Storm, winners of the 2009 NRL Grand Final.

See also 
 Super League XIV
 Super League play-offs

References 

Results